The 1944 United States presidential election in North Dakota took place on November 7, 1944, as part of the 1944 United States presidential election. Voters chose four representatives, or electors, to the Electoral College, who voted for president and vice president.

North Dakota was won by Governor Thomas E. Dewey (R–New York), running with Governor John Bricker, with 53.84% of the popular vote, against incumbent President Franklin D. Roosevelt (D–New York), running with Missouri Senator Harry S. Truman, with 45.48% of the popular vote.

Results

Results by county

See also
 United States presidential elections in North Dakota

References

North Dakota
1944
1944 North Dakota elections